Staten Island Legal Services (SILS) is an American non-profit agency providing free civil legal assistance to low-income people on Staten Island in New York City. SILS has served more than 10,000 clients after its creation in 2004.

Services
The agency provides legal services in the areas including of family law, domestic violence, immigration, foreclosure prevention, and disaster recovery services (post–Hurricane Sandy).
SILS also provides advice or referral information if unable to provide representation. Special projects have included defending the rights of the disabled to reasonable accommodations from the New York City Housing Authority.

See also

 Legal Services Corporation
 Legal Services NYC
 Pro bono

References

External links
 
 Decision in Williams v. NYCHA Motion to Dismiss

Legal aid in the United States
Legal organizations based in the United States
2004 establishments in New York City
Organizations established in 2004